Valeria Teresita Muller (born 13 May 1974) is a road cyclist from Argentina. She participated at the 2010 UCI Road World Championships and 2011 UCI Road World Championships. She is a twelve-time winner of the Argentine National Time Trial Championships.

Major results

2000
 National Road Championships
1st  Time trial
3rd Road race
2001
 1st  Time trial, National Road Championships
2002
 1st  Time trial, National Road Championships
2004
 2nd Time trial, National Road Championships
2005
 National Road Championships
1st  Time trial
3rd Road race
2006
 2nd Time trial, National Road Championships
2007
 2nd Time trial, National Road Championships
2008
 National Road Championships
1st  Time trial
2nd Road race
 6th Time trial, Pan American Road Championships
2009
 1st  Time trial, National Road Championships
2010
 1st  Time trial, National Road Championships
2011
 1st  Time trial, National Road Championships
 4th Time trial, Pan American Road Championships
 10th Time trial, Pan American Games
2012
 1st  Time trial, National Road Championships
 5th Time trial, Pan American Road Championships
2014
 National Road Championships
1st  Time trial
1st  Road race
2015
 1st  Time trial, National Road Championships
 9th Overall Tour Femenino de San Luis
2016
 3rd Time trial, National Road Championships
2017
 1st  Time trial, National Road Championships
 10th Time trial, Pan American Road Championships
2019
 National Road Championships
2nd Time trial
3rd Road race

References

External links

1974 births
Argentine female cyclists
Living people
Place of birth missing (living people)
South American Games bronze medalists for Argentina
South American Games medalists in cycling
Competitors at the 2010 South American Games
21st-century Argentine women